

Yarn size 
Depending on the exact yarn weight and the gauge of the knitter or crocheter and how tight or loose the yarn is held, the gauge listed below can vary. For this reason it is important to check the gauge of the pattern being used to be sure so the finished project is the desired size. Most patterns have a listed gauge to create an item of the size(s) indicated in the pattern.

Terminology 
Common terms used to describe knitting and crochet yarn properties.

Fiber type

Plant based

Cottons 
All varieties of cotton have a dull finish unless mercerized.  Cotton yarn has minimal elasticity unless blended with other fibers.  Pure cotton is useful for projects that require structure such as purses and tote bags, placemats, and other utilitarian items.

Other plant fibers

Animal based fibers

Synthetics

Notes

References
 Debbie Stoller, Stitch 'N Bitch Crochet: The Happy Hooker New York: Workman Publishing, 2006.
 Edie Eckman, The Crochet Answer Book, North Adams, Massachesetts: Storey Publishing, 2005.

Crochet
Knitting